Ilch FC, also known as Ilč Sport Klub, is a Mongolian professional football club that currently competes in the Mongolia First League.

History
The club was founded in 2020. That year it finished second in the National Amateur Cup behind Khad FC and earned promotion to the Second League. For the 2021 season the club won its second consecutive promotion and the right to compete in the First League in 2022.

Domestic history
Key

References

External links
Eleven Sports channel

Football clubs in Mongolia